The Best of Odetta: Ballads and Blues is a compilation album by American folk singer Odetta, originally released in 1994.

The focus of the material is the music Odetta performed when recording for the Tradition label —  Odetta Sings Ballads and Blues (1956) and Odetta at the Gate of Horn (1957). Tradition released The Best of Odetta on LP with a slightly different track list in 1967.

It was also re-released on CD on the Collectables label in 2006.

Track listing
All songs Traditional unless otherwise noted.
 "He's Got the Whole World in His Hands" – 1:59
 "Lowlands" – 2:41
 "The Fox" – 1:53
 "The Lass from the Low Countree" (John Jacob Niles) – 4:40
 "Devilish Mary" – 1:57
 "Take This Hammer" (Ledbetter) – 3:33
 "Greensleeves" – 2:49
 "Deep River" – 3:00
 "Chilly Winds" – 2:43
 "If I Had a Ribbon Bow" (Huey Prince, Lou Singer) – 2:43
 "Shame and Scandal" (Sir Lancelot) – 2:23
 "'Buked and Scorned" – 2:40
 "Joshua" – 1:54
 "Glory, Glory" – 2:13
 "Been in the Pen" – 2:32
 "Deep Blue Sea" – 3:02
 "God's Gonna Cut You Down" – 1:51
 Spiritual Trilogy" – 6:05

Personnel
Odetta – vocals, guitar
Bill Lee – bass

References

1994 greatest hits albums
Odetta compilation albums